Andrew Donald Magee (born May 22, 1962) is an American professional golfer who played for more than 20 years on the PGA Tour.

Magee was born in Paris, France, where his father, a Texas oil man, was working at the time. He grew up in Dallas, Texas. Magee attended the University of Oklahoma from 1981–1984. While there he was a distinguished member of the golf team, winning All-American honors three times. He turned pro in 1984 and joined the PGA Tour in 1985.

Magee won four PGA Tour events. His first win came in 1988 at the Pensacola Open. In 1991, he won two Tour events and was awarded Golf Digests Most Improved Golfer Award. His most recent win was at the 1994 Northern Telecom Open. His best finish in a major was T5 at the 1992 British Open. He has featured in the top 50 of the Official World Golf Rankings.

Magee is the only person in PGA Tour history to hit a hole-in-one on a par 4 hole during a PGA Tour event. He did this with a driver at the 332-yard 17th hole of the 2001 Phoenix Open. The ball caromed off Tom Byrum's putter on its way to the bottom of the cup. Byrum, in the group ahead, was squatting down looking over a putt.

In 1999 Magee won the Southern Company Citizenship Award (which now sponsors the Payne Stewart Award) for his work with charities.

In February 2006, Magee underwent surgery to remove a cancerous tumor from his left kidney at the Cleveland Clinic in Cleveland, Ohio. The operation was deemed successful and he was back playing on the Tour in April.

In January 2007, Magee signed on with The Golf Channel as an analyst for its new show The Approach with Callaway Golf and for the Sprint Pre-Game and Sprint Post-Game shows.  Magee was also the host of the Golf Channel's 2008 season of The Big Break, which was set in Hawaii.

During the summer of 2006 Magee's eldest son, Campbell, caddied for him in five tour events. Campbell is a graduate of Brophy College Preparatory, where he played competitive lacrosse; Campbell later attended the University of Arizona.

Magee resides in Paradise Valley, Arizona. His last PGA Tour cut was the 2006 Southern Farm Bureau Classic. Prior to age 50, the last cut he made on a professional tour was at the Nationwide Tour's 2009 BMW Charity Pro-Am. Since reaching age 50, Magee has played in a limited number of events on the Champions Tour.

Professional wins (6)
PGA Tour wins (4)

*Note: The 1991 Nestle Invitational was shortened to 54 holes due to rain.PGA Tour playoff record (1–0)'

Other wins (2)
1991 Jerry Ford Invitational
1992 Jerry Ford Invitational

Results in major championships

CUT = missed the half-way cut
"T" = tied

Summary

Most consecutive cuts made – 10 (1991 Open Championship – 1994 Masters)
Longest streak of top-10s – 1 (twice)

Results in The Players Championship

CUT = missed the halfway cut
"T" indicates a tie for a place

Results in World Golf Championships

QF, R16, R32, R64 = Round in which player lost in match play

See also
1984 PGA Tour Qualifying School graduates

References

External links

American male golfers
Oklahoma Sooners men's golfers
PGA Tour golfers
PGA Tour Champions golfers
Golf writers and broadcasters
Golfers from Paris
Golfers from Dallas
Golfers from Arizona
People from Paradise Valley, Arizona
Sportspeople from the Phoenix metropolitan area
1962 births
Living people